Radha Kuchi is a village near the town of Baihata, Kamrup district, Assam, India.

Location
Nanara, Aagdola and Nagaon are the neighboring villages of Radha Kuchi. It belongs to the Karara Gaon Panchayat and the Bihdia block.

Festivals
The Magh Bihu is the main festival of the village, but villagers also celebrate Kati Bihu, Rongal, Bihu functions, Maha Shivaratri and Laxmi Puja. Magh Bihu is largely celebrated in this village, and the Bihu is a part of three Bihu according to Assamese mythology. Maha Shivratri is also celebrated by the village's large Hindu population.

Places
Radha kuchi village is a village with many small parts where people from different casts and religion live. The main parts are Hindu chuburi and Muslim chuburi.

References

Villages in Kamrup district